Chrysoblephus anglicus, the Englishman seabream, is a fish that is endemic to South Africa and occurs from Algoa Bay to Mozambique. The fish is silvery with a blue spot on the dorsal scales and 4 red vertical stripes across the body.

It is also a popular eating fish.

References 

 http://fishbase.org/summary/Chrysoblephus-anglicus.html

Sparidae
Endemic fauna of South Africa